Eusonia Records is an independent record label founded by American record producer, songwriter and multi-instrumentalist Scott Jacoby. The label currently has four artists on its roster: Maiysha, SiLyA, Zach Deputy and Jacoby himself, as well as the soundtrack for the 2013 film My Last Day Without You.

Eusonia Records releases are primarily recorded and mixed at its recording facility, Eusonia Studios, in Manhattan.

Etymology
In an interview with ASCAP in 2011, Jacoby stated that the word "eusonia" borrows from Greek and Latin, and means "home of good music".

History
Jacoby founded Eusonia Records in 2007 with capital that he raised from family and friends. The label earned its first Grammy nomination when "Wanna Be", from Maiysha's debut studio album This Much Is True, was nominated for Best Urban/Alternative Performance in 2009. In 2010, Jacoby teamed up with his partner James McKinney to run the label as its chief operating officer (COO).

In 2016, Eusonia partnered with the Anguilla Music Academy and The Grammy Museum to create the Music Revolution Project in Anguilla.

Releases

References
Notes

Citations

External links
 

Record labels established in 2007
American independent record labels